Thomas Meredith FTCD (1777–1819) was an Anglo-Irish clergyman, Doctor of Divinity, Fellow of Trinity College, Dublin, and a distinguished mathematician who gave his findings before the Royal Irish Academy in Dublin. He is best remembered for his association with the poet Charles Wolfe and as the subject of a ghost story related in True Irish Ghost Stories and Memorials to the Dead.

Background

Born at Templerany House, Co. Wicklow, he was the eldest son of Ralph Meredith (1748–1799), Attorney Exchequer and Justice of the Peace for County Dublin; and his wife Martha (1752–1834), daughter of Thomas Chaytor (1728–1797) of Charlemont Place, Dublin; the owner of extensive lands in County Clare. Meredith's father, a member of the Royal Dublin Society, had chosen a legal career in Dublin and passed the management of Templerany (where his family had made their home since the late seventeenth century) to his younger brother, William Meredith (1752–1791), who lived there with his wife, Sarah Garrett (1758–1822) of Janeville & Mount Pleasant House, Co. Carlow; niece of John Cole, 1st Baron Mountflorence, of Florence Court. Thomas Meredith was a grandson of the John Meredith (1711–1786) of Templerany, who c.1750 had two portraits (one large, one small) painted with his whippet by William Hoare at Bath.

Career
From his childhood home in Dublin on Harcourt Street, he was tutored by a relative, Samuel Crumpe, a first cousin of the better known Dr Samuel Crumpe. Meredith's father signed him into Trinity College, Dublin, as a pensioner in 1791 (spelling his name 'Meredyth'). Two years later, in 1793, he was elected a scholar of the college, and in 1795 he graduated with a BA degree. Following university he spent the next few years managing his property in counties Wicklow, Wexford and Dublin, but using his spare time to work on new mathematical theories. In 1805, he took his M.A. and in the same year was elected a Fellow of Trinity College, where he is remembered as a distinguished mathematician and according to the biography of Charles Dickinson was, "reckoned by many as the best lecturer and tutor of his time in college". At his Dublin home, 1 Fitzwilliam Square, he kept a collection of books and maps.

In 1842, an article was written for the Dublin University Magazine by Mrs Meredith's cousin, Robert Perceval Graves (brother of Charles Graves). It celebrated the achievements of Graves' friend Sir William Rowan Hamilton, stating that Thomas Meredith was astonished by Hamilton's extraordinary intellectual abilities: "We well remember to have heard, long before we ever saw our friend, of Dr Meredith… a man of great learning and ability, reporting with expressions of astonishment, that he had examined in the country a child of six or seven, who read, translated and understood Hebrew better than many candidates for fellowship; this child was young Hamilton".

In 1811, Meredith took a Bachelor of Divinity degree, and the following year he was awarded as a Doctor of Divinity. He retired his fellowship in 1813 to take the living of Ardtrea, Co. Tyrone, which was open exclusively to those who had held fellowships at Trinity College. The parish tithes amounted to £738 a year, but in addition to this the rector of Ardtrea also held stewardship over the manor of Ardtrea, making the living a particularly valuable one. Ardtrea House, the Rectory or Glebe house where he took up residence with his family, was described as "a large and handsome house built of hewn freestone" with a small Palladian-style Gate Lodge at the foot of the driveway. Meredith was remembered at Ardtrea for never turning a man away from his door, always having a silver coin for those who came to him in need.

He was Rector of Ardtrea for six years, until his untimely death in 1819 at the age of forty two. His father-in-law, Richard Graves, wrote, "...and now another apparently most calamitous visitation presents itself, in the sudden death of my beloved and excellent son-in-law, by apoplexy, a disorder of which of all men he seemed least liable." The Freeman's Journal of Dublin reported, "Learned, amiable, and unassuming, Thomas Meredith was unfeignedly respected and sincerely beloved by his numerous acquaintance and friends, all of whom deeply deplore his premature departure. He has left behind him an amiable and disconsolate widow and a family of seven children, most of whom are yet too young to feel the irreparable loss which they have sustained".  He was succeeded at Ardtrea by the orientalist, Edward Hincks.

Charles Wolfe
The poet, Charles Wolfe, was much attached to, and a great admirer of Thomas Meredith. He was the Curate of nearby Donaghmore, County Tyrone and a frequent guest of the Merediths at Ardtrea. Chiefly remembered today for his poem The Burial of Sir John Moore after Corunna, brought to the attention of the public by Lord Byron, Wolfe was also the author of the inscription on Meredith's memorial at the Church of Ardtrea and a previously unpublished epitaph for his tomb. The memorial is made of black and white marble and is surmounted by the Meredith family crest and coat of arms:

Sacred to the memory of THOMAS MEREDITH D.D., Formerly Fellow of Trinity College Dublin, And 6 years Rector of this Parish. A man who gave to learning a beauty not its own, And threw over Science and Literature the lustre of the Gospel And the sweet influence of Christianity. The talents which he clothed in humility And his silent and unobtrusive benevolence Were unable to escape the respect and admiration of society: But those who witnessed him in the bosom of his family And shared the treasures of his conversation Seldom failed to find the ways of wisdom more pleasant than before And to discover fresh loveliness in that Gospel Upon which his hopes and his ministry were founded He was summoned from a family of which he was the support and delight And from the flock to which he was eminently endeared On 2nd May 1819 in the 42nd year of his age By a sudden and awful visitation but he knew That his Redeemer lived. ‘Erected by his Sons’.

Charles Wolfe wrote a poem for Meredith, meant as a second epitaph intended for the tomb itself:

In 1817, Wolfe wrote a letter demonstrating how he valued Meredith’s friendship,

I am surrounded by grandees, who count their income by thousands, and by clergymen innumerable; however, I have kept out of their reach; I have preferred my turf-fire, my books, and the memory of the friends I have left, to all the society that Tyrone can furnish… with one bright exception. At Meredith’s I am indeed every way at home; I am at home in friendship and hospitality, in science and literature, in our common friends and acquaintance, and in topics of religion.

In a brief memoir to Charles Wolfe's life, published in 1842, The Ven. John A. Russell (Archdeacon of Clogher), introduces Meredith as follows,

The following letter (quoted below) gives an affecting account of the death of a valued friend, to whom he (Wolfe) had lately become particularly attached, the Rev. Dr Meredith, formerly a fellow of Trinity College, Dublin, and then rector of Ardtrea. He was esteemed one of the most distinguished scholars in the university to which he belonged. His genius for mathematical acquirements especially, was universally allowed to be of the first order; and his qualifications as a public examiner and lecturer were so eminent, as to render his early retirement from the duties of a fellowship a serious loss to the college. Of our author's talents he entertained the highest opinion; and his congeniality of disposition soon led him to appreciate fully the still higher qualities of his heart.

The letter was headed ‘Castle Caulfield, 4 May 1819’, where Wolfe was presumably staying, and it expresses his anguish at Meredith’s death as well as the deep respect he held for his friend,

My Dear... I am just come from the house of mourning! Last night I helped to lay poor Meredith in his coffin, and followed him this morning to his grave. The visitation was truly awful. Last Tuesday (this day week) he was struck to the ground by a fit of apoplexy, and from that moment until the hour of his death, on Sunday evening, he never articulated. I did not hear of his danger until Sunday evening, and yesterday morning I ran ten miles [16 km], like a madman, and was only in time to see his dead body. It will be a cruel and bitter thought to me for many a day, that I had not one farewell from him, while he was on the brink of the world. Oh… one of my heart-strings is broken ! The only way I have of describing my attachment to that man, is by telling you, that next to you and Dickinson, he was the person in whose society I took the greatest delight. A visit to Ardtrea was often in prospect to sustain me in many of my cheerless labours. My gems are falling away; But I do hope and trust, it is because 'God is making up his jewels'. Dr Meredith was a man of a truly Christian temper of mind. We used naturally to fall upon religious subjects; And I now revert, with peculiar gratification, to the cordiality with which we took sweet counsel together upon these topics. You know that he was possessed of the first and most distinguishing characteristic of a Christian disposition, humility. He preached the Sunday before for _, and the surmon was unusually solemn and impressive, and in the true spirit of the Gospel. Indeed, from several circumstances, he seems to have had some strange presentiments of what was to happen. His air and look some time before his dissolution had, as _ told me, an expression of the most awful and profound devotion.

Ghost and silver bullet

In regards to the 'sudden and awful visitation' that took his life, referred to on Meredith's memorial at Ardtrea, there are two curious stories told about him shooting at a ghost with a silver bullet. The first appeared in a book called Memorials to the Dead (published 1903, page 462). In 1924, the Rev. (William) Ernest Richard Scott (born 1874) was the Rector of Ardtrea. Coincidentally, he was married to Adelaide Creed Meredith (1878–1968), sister of James Creed Meredith, and one of Thomas Meredith's great granddaughters. Scott wrote a letter to Lt.-Colonel Colborne Powell Meredith of Ottawa, one of Meredith's grandchildren. The letter is kept at the National Archives of Canada, and is based on the account of Meredith's death as recorded in Memorials to the Dead:

In the parish of Ardtrea, in the County of Tyrone, stands the big rectory in which I took up my abode, with my family, on my appointment to the living in 1914. It is a curious house, with a curious history – a huge, grim, rambling building standing in the midst of forty-five acres of grounds. Erected over a century ago (1805) for a wealthy incumbent (the man who Meredith succeeded), at a time when parochial values were very different from what they are today, the atmosphere of the place seems to be impregnated with that peculiar blend of mystery and superstition which surrounds so many old houses of the kind. The rectory of Ardtrea, however, would appear to have more justification than most for the mixed feelings with which it is regarded by the simple country folk around.

Its very situation lends itself to thoughts of the mysterious. Magnificent beech trees stand upon the lawn (which it is said were planted by the sons of Thomas Meredith), and other forest giants and mournful yews are ringed about the grey old mansion. The long carriage-drive, too, is guarded by a noble avenue of great trees, and thick masses of ivy cluster upon the walls which flank the great wooden door enclosing the courtyard.

If its situation and appearance bears the impress of the unusual, so likewise do its traditions. One of its first inhabitants (the second), Dr Thomas Meredith, a former Fellow of Trinity College Dublin, Rector of Ardtrea for six years, and great-grandfather of my wife, died within its doors in 1819 from a 'sudden and awful visitation', as his tombstone states.

Exactly what this was no one seems to know, but the story runs that a governess employed by Dr Meredith was troubled by a ghost, which took the form of a lady arrayed in white – possibly, averred local tradition, the Virgin Saint Trea, who lived hereabout in the fifth century. This apparition greatly troubled the good doctor, and on the advice of a friend he charged a gun with a solid silver bullet and lay in wait for the midnight visitor. In due course a report (shot) was heard, and next day the Rector lay dying upon the flagged floor of a basement room. From that hour the country-people looked a skant upon the 'haunted' house, and avoided it whenever possible.

The second variation of the event appeared in True Irish Ghost Stories (published in 1926) by St. John Drelincourt Seymour, a relative of Meredith's wife, under the chapter 'Legendary and Ancestral ghosts'.

In the Parish Church of Ardtrea, near Cookstown, is a marble monument and inscription in memory of Thomas Meredith, D.D., who had been a Fellow of Trinity College, Dublin, and for six years rector of the parish. He died, according to the words of the inscription, on 2nd May 1819, as a result of "a sudden and awful visitation." A local legend explains this "visitation," by stating that a ghost haunted the rectory, the visits of which had caused his family and servants to leave the house.

The rector had tried to shoot it but failed; then he was told to use a silver bullet; he did so, and next morning was found dead at his hall-door while a hideous object like a devil made horrid noises out of any window the servant man approached. This man was advised by some Roman Catholic neighbours to get the priest, who would "lay" the thing. The priest arrived, and with the help of a jar of whisky the ghost became quite civil, till the last glass in the jar, which the priest was about to empty out for himself, whereupon the ghost or devil made himself as thin and long as a Lough Neagh eel, and slipped himself into the jar to get the last drops. But the priest put the cork into its place and hammered it in, and, making the sign of the Cross on it, he had the evil thing secured. It was buried in the cellar of the rectory, where on some nights it can still be heard calling to be let out.

Family

At Dublin on 7 July 1807, Thomas Meredith married Elizabeth Maria (1791–1855), the eldest daughter of Richard Graves, by his wife, Elizabeth Maria (1767–1827), the eldest daughter of the Rev. James Drought (1738–1820) of Ridgemount House, Ballyboy, King's Co. (Co. Offaly) and Ferbans, County Wicklow, a nephew of the 'learned savage', his mother's brother, Theaker Wilder. Mrs Meredith, sister of Robert James Graves, was described as 'a lady of much culture and refinement, and possessed also of great energy and force of character.' They were the parents of seven children, first cousins of John Walsingham Cooke Meredith and Sir James Creed Meredith,
 Mary Anne Meredith, "both beautiful and accomplished.. A born actress, she could move her hearers to tears or laughter, and a musician too". She died young in Ireland.
 Rev. Richard Graves Meredith (1810–1871), of Timoleague, Co. Cork. Tall for his time at 6'4", he was educated at Trinity College, Dublin, and afterwards he lived in London, where he was a close friend of the poet Thomas Campbell with whom he helped to found the Literary Association of the Friends of Poland, of which he was secretary. In 1841, he married Martha, daughter of Thomas Johnston J.P., of Fort Johnston, Co. Monaghan, and Maria, daughter of the Rev. Dr James Hingston (1755–1840) J.P., of Aglish, Co. Cork. In 1850, he married secondly Eleanor Howe, daughter of John Howe, of Glanavirane House, Howe's Strand, High Sheriff of Co. Cork, and his wife Eliza Scott, daughter of Benjamin Scott of Coolmain Castle, Co. Cork, first cousin of Francis Bernard, 1st Earl of Bandon. One of his daughters married his first cousin, Sir James Creed Meredith.
 Chief Justice Sir William Collis Meredith, married Sophia Holmes, granddaughter of William Holmes (Surgeon-General) and Colonel James Johnston (1724-1800)
 Harriet Meredith (1813–1906), married William Henry Kittson, brother of Norman Kittson, step grandsons of Alexander Henry the elder
 Ralph Henry Howard Meredith (1815–1892), of Port Hope, Ontario. His daughter married the brother of Colonel Arthur Trefusis Heneage Williams. His granddaughter, Lorraine Seymour Percy, married Judge James Creed Meredith, of Dublin, the son of his first cousin.
 Edmund Allen Meredith (1817–1899), Principal of McGill University, married Frances Jarvis, daughter of William Botsford Jarvis, of Rosedale, Toronto
 Thomas L. Meredith (1819–1843), died in Ireland
After Meredith's death, his widow moved their family back to Harcourt Street, Dublin. In 1824, but without the approval of her parents, she remarried her mother's widowed cousin, the Rev. (James) Edmund Burton (1776–1850), "who wasted every farthing of his Irish property before having the sense to migrate to Canada". According to Burton's nephew, Captain Sir Richard Francis Burton, Eliza had originally been his first choice of wife, but she had preferred Thomas Meredith to him. He was the son of the Rev. Edward Burton (b.1747) of Newgarden House, Annaghdown, Co. Galway, by his wife Maria Margaretta Campbell, Eliza Meredith's great aunt. Edmund Burton was also the uncle of Lady Henry William Stisted.

Seemingly after Burton had squandered his property in Ireland, at the invitation of the 'Society for the Propagation of the Gospel in Foreign Parts', he went to Terrebonne, Quebec, becoming the county's first Anglican minister. The attraction may have been that with the job he was also granted  of land. By the time he returned to Ireland, he had added another  to his property, perhaps in an attempt to regain what he had lost in Ireland. After the death of his first wife, he returned home to find a new bride for his ten motherless children. On marrying the widowed Eliza Meredith, he waited until the summer of that year (1824) to return with his new wife and four of her children to his house and farm, 'Burtonville' (where the village of Sainte-Julienne, Quebec is found today), outside the village of Rawdon, Quebec, which was then a four-day journey north of Montreal.

They lived there until 1833 before settling at Cloyne, Co. Cork. Eliza 'conveniently' left all the Burton children by her husband's first marriage in Canada, according to them, 'in an unconcerned manner'. By Mr Burton she had a further six children, though it was noted by her son Edmund Allen Meredith to one of his brothers, that "all the Graves' (underlined) entertain such a decided antipathy to Mr Burton that I do not think they would feel disposed to undertake the charge in anyway of one of his children". However, the Meredith children were said to have taken a great interest in the education and welfare of their younger half brothers and sisters. Thomas Meredith's widow died at 84 Great King Street, Edinburgh, the home of Major Robert Graves Burton M.D., of the 6th (Inniskilling) Dragoons, one of her sons by her second marriage, on 31 March 1855.

Notes

19th-century Irish Anglican priests
Irish mathematicians
Doctors of Divinity
Fellows of Trinity College Dublin
People from County Wicklow
1777 births
1819 deaths
Deaths from cerebrovascular disease